Brick is an American band that created a successful merger of funk and jazz in the 1970s. Their most popular single was "Dazz", (#3 U.S. Pop, #1 U.S. R&B, #36 UK Singles Chart) which was released in 1976.

History
Brick was formed in Atlanta, Georgia, in 1972 by Regi Hargis from members of two bands - one disco and the other jazz. They coined their own term for disco-jazz, "dazz". They released their first single "Music Matic" on Main Street Records in 1976, before signing to the independently distributed Bang Records. Their next single, "Dazz", (#3 Pop, #1 R&B) was released in 1976. The band continued to record for Bang records until 1982. Other hits followed: "That's What It's All About" (R&B #48) and "Dusic" (#18 Pop, #2 R&B) in 1977, and "Ain't Gonna Hurt Nobody" (#92 Pop, #7 R&B) in 1978. Their last Top Ten R&B hit was "Sweat (Til You Get Wet)" in 1981.

Donald Nevins died on August 7, 2011, at the age of 62. Founder and guitarist Regi Hargis died on October 15, 2021, at the age of 70.

Members
 Jimmy Brown (lead vocals, saxophone, flute, trombone)
 Billy Barlow (keyboards)
 Tres Gilbert (bass guitar)
 Melvin Baldwin (drums and percussion)
 Tomi Martin (lead guitar)
 Sherita Murphy (lead and background vocals)

Former members include:
 Regi Hargis (guitar/bass guitar/vocals); died 2021
 Ray Ransom (lead vocals/bass/keyboards/percussion)
 Donald Nevins (vocals/acoustic piano/clavinet/Moog); died 2011
 Edward D. Irons Jr. (lead vocals/drums/keyboards)
 Ambric Bridgeforth (vocals/keyboards)

Discography

Studio albums

Compilation albums
The Best of Brick (1995)
Super Hits (2000)

Singles

References

External links
 Official website
 Facebook page
 
 

1972 establishments in Georgia (U.S. state)
African-American musical groups
American disco groups
American funk musical groups
Musical groups established in 1972
Musical groups from Georgia (U.S. state)
Bang Records artists
Musical groups from Atlanta